Cornishville is an unincorporated community located in Mercer County, Kentucky, United States. Its post office  is closed.

Cornishville was incorporated in 1847.

References

Unincorporated communities in Mercer County, Kentucky
Unincorporated communities in Kentucky